Vigiliae Christianae: A Review of Early Christian Life and Languages is a peer-reviewed academic journal published by Brill Publishers in the field of early Christian studies. 

According to the publisher:
 The initiators of this journal were Jan Hendrik Waszink and Christine Mohrmann.

Current editors 
The current editors-in-chief of the Journal are:

 Katharina Greschat (Ruhr University Bochum) 
 Joseph Lössl (Cardiff University) 
 Johannes (Hans) van Oort (Radboud University Nijmegen) 
 Bart D. Ehrman (University of North Carolina at Chapel Hill) 
 G.A.M. Rouwhorst (Tilburg University) 
 David T. Runia (University of Melbourne) 
 Clemens Scholten (University of Cologne)

Abstracting and indexing 
The journal is abstracted and indexed in Academic Search, Arts & Humanities Citation Index  ATLA Religion Database, Bibliography of the History of Art, Current Contents, Index Theologicus, MLA International Bibliography of Books & Articles on the Modern Languages and Literatures, and the Russian Academy of Sciences Bibliographies.

References

External links 
 

Journals about ancient Christianity
English-language journals
Quarterly journals
Publications established in 1947
Brill Publishers academic journals